The Baarin are a Southern Mongol subgroup. Daur people and some Baarin people of Baarin Right Banner are direct descendants of Khitans. The hairstyles of some Baarin women are similar to the Khitans. They live in Bairin Left Banner and Baarin Right Banner of Inner Mongolia of China.

See also
Baarin dialect
Bayan of the Baarin-general of Mongol Empire.
Baarin, a village in northern Syria.
List of medieval Mongol tribes and clans

References 

Mongol peoples
Mongolian tribes and clans
Southern Mongols
Borjigin
Nirun Mongols